Ilya Lvovich Vorobyov (born 11 July 1999) is a Russian football player who plays for FC Leningradets Leningrad Oblast.

Club career
He made his debut in the Russian Football National League for FC Zenit-2 Saint Petersburg on 17 July 2018 in a game against FC Tambov.

He made his debut for the main squad of FC Zenit Saint Petersburg on 25 September 2019 in a Russian Cup game against FC Yenisey Krasnoyarsk.

On 28 August 2020, he joined FC Khimki on loan for the 2020–21 season. He made his Russian Premier League debut for Khimki on 29 August 2020 in a game against FC Rotor Volgograd.

Honours

Club
Zenit Saint Petersburg
 Russian Cup: 2019–20

References

External links
 
 
 
 Profile by Russian Football National League

1999 births
Footballers from Saint Petersburg
Living people
Russian footballers
Association football midfielders
Association football forwards
FC Zenit Saint Petersburg players
FC Zenit-2 Saint Petersburg players
FC Khimki players
FC Orenburg players
FC Veles Moscow players
Russian Premier League players
Russian First League players
Russian Second League players